Robert Fred Eastwood (born February 9, 1946) is an American professional golfer who has won numerous amateur and professional tournaments.

Eastwood was born in Providence, Rhode Island, but spent most of his youth in north-central California. He started playing golf at age 4 as a result of his father being in the golf business. He helped his family construct Dry Creek Ranch Golf Club near Sacramento in the 1960s. During the 1960s, Eastwood served in the Army and was stationed in Korea. During this same decade he also attended San Joaquin Delta Community College and San Jose State University in San Jose, California. He turned pro in 1969.

Eastwood has had a streaky career in amateur and professional golf. He won several amateur tournaments in the middle 1960s. His three wins on the PGA Tour came during a 15-month period in the mid-1980s. Likewise, his two wins on the Champions Tour both came in the same year, 1997. He has also had long dry spells with no victories and few top-10 finishes. His best finish in a major was a T-14 at the 1987 U.S. Open.

Eastwood lives in Fort Worth, Texas. He enjoys hunting and fishing in his spare time.

Amateur wins (5)
1965 (2) Sacramento City Amateur Championship, Stockton City Championship
1966 (2) California State Amateur, Stockton City Championship
1968 (1) West Coast Athletic Conference Championship (individual)

Professional wins (10)

PGA Tour wins (3)

PGA Tour playoff record (1–0)

Canadian Tour wins (2)
1979 (1) Windsor Charity Classic
1980 (1) Windsor Charity Classic

Other wins (3)
1973 (1) Mini-Kemper Open
1976 (1) Little Bing Crosby
1981 (1) Hassan II Golf Trophy

Senior PGA Tour wins (2)

*Note: The 1997 Bell Atlantic Classic was shortened to 36 holes due to rain.

Senior PGA Tour playoff record (0–1)

Results in major championships

Note: Eastwood never played in The Open Championship.

CUT = missed the half-way cut
"T" = tied

Results in The Players Championship

CUT = missed the halfway cut
"T" indicates a tie for a place

See also
Spring 1969 PGA Tour Qualifying School graduates
1989 PGA Tour Qualifying School graduates

References

External links

American male golfers
San Jose State Spartans men's golfers
PGA Tour golfers
PGA Tour Champions golfers
Golfers from Rhode Island
Golfers from Texas
Sportspeople from Providence, Rhode Island
Sportspeople from Fort Worth, Texas
1946 births
Living people